Enyu Dinev Todorov (22 February 1943 – 26 May 2022) was a Bulgarian featherweight freestyle wrestler. He won a silver medal at the 1968 Summer Olympic Games in Mexico City, and the European title in 1969 in Sofia and in 1970 in Berlin.

References

1943 births
2022 deaths
Sportspeople from Stara Zagora
Olympic wrestlers of Bulgaria
Wrestlers at the 1968 Summer Olympics
Bulgarian male sport wrestlers
Olympic silver medalists for Bulgaria
Olympic medalists in wrestling
Medalists at the 1968 Summer Olympics